Mark Robert Acre (born September 16, 1968) is an American former professional baseball pitcher. He played all or part of four seasons for the Oakland Athletics of Major League Baseball (MLB) from –. He also played one season for the Yakult Swallows of the Nippon Professional Baseball (NPB) in 1998.

External links

1968 births
Living people
American expatriate baseball players in Canada
American expatriate baseball players in Japan
American men's basketball players
Baseball players from California
Edmonton Trappers players
Junior college men's basketball players in the United States
Major League Baseball pitchers
New Mexico State Aggies baseball players
New Mexico State Aggies men's basketball players
Nippon Professional Baseball pitchers
Oakland Athletics players
People from Concord, California
Yakult Swallows players